Diana Mordasini is a writer and journalist born in Saint-Louis, Senegal. She studied classical literature at the Sorbonne and worked for a time in the fashion industry. She later became a columnist for a Milan-based publishing house. She has lived in Switzerland for over 20 years.

Bibliography
Le Bottillon perdu [The lost ankle boot] . Dakar: Les Nouvelles Editions Africaines du Sénégal, 1990. (101p.). . Novel. 
La cage aux déesses volume 1 : De fil en meurtres Paris: Société des écrivains, 2002 (440p.). . Novel. 
La cage aux déesses volume 2 Les yeux d'Ilh'a Paris: Société des écrivains, 2002 (510p.). . Novel.

References

External links
UWA

Living people
People from Saint-Louis, Senegal
Senegalese non-fiction writers
Senegalese women writers
University of Paris alumni
Year of birth missing (living people)